Geoff Kerr may refer to:

Geoff Kerr (footballer, born 1925) (1925–2020), Australian rules footballer for St Kilda during 1945 and 1947
Geoff Kerr (footballer, born 1944), Australian rules footballer for St Kilda during 1964